John Parker (born 17 May 1971) is a former Australian rules footballer who played with the Brisbane Bears in the Australian Football League (AFL).

Parker, from Frankston, was chosen by the Bears with the first pick of the 1992 Mid-Season Draft.

He didn't play a senior game that year and instead made his debut during the 1993 season, against Carlton at Princes Park.

The following week he played again, this time a home fixture against North Melbourne and he had 11 disposals.

His only other appearance for the Bears came in a 104-point loss to Fitzroy.

References

1971 births
Australian rules footballers from Victoria (Australia)
Brisbane Bears players
Frankston Bombers players
Living people